Beisong is a town in Lijin County, Dongying, Shandong province, China. , it had two miner's residential communities and 72 villages under its administration:
Miner's communities
Shengli Oilfield Binnan Second Mine
Shengli Oilfield Binnan Third Mine

Villages
Beisong Village
Wazhang Village
Yangdong Village
Daniu Village
Qianwang Village
Houwang Village
Zhaijia Village
Pohan Village
Jiajia Village
Jianliu Village
Wujia Village
Shanjia Village
Rentian Village
Chuguan Village
Bojiliujia Village
Liangjia Village
Wangjia Village
Zhangjia Village
Qianlin Village
Zhonglin Village
Houliu Village
Houwang Village
Caiyu Village
Bianjia Village
Liugao Village
Majia Village
Dagai Village
Xiaoguo Village
Dawang Village
Dao'an Village
Xisun Village
Sanhe Village
Yinjia Village
Guili Village
Yujia Village
Xujia Village
Daijia Village
Dongjia Village
Xiaoma Village
Fengjia Village
Houcui Village
Liucheng Village
Linjia Village
Xiajia Village
Hougong Village
Qiangong Village
Wuzhuang Village
Situ Village
Zhangpanma Village
Shuanghe Village
Hetaoli Village
Nansong Village
Xianglishang Village
Xianglixia Village
Chuanwang Village
Zaohuwang Village
Nianli Village
Songji Village
Panjia Village
Hanjia Village
Daocha Village
Liujia Village
Sancha Village
Gaojia Village
Shimen Village
Tanqushanjia Village
Dingjia Village
Fangzi Village
Tongjia Village
Nanjiajia Village
Dongwang Village
Qiancui Village

See also 
 List of township-level divisions of Shandong

References 

Township-level divisions of Shandong
Lijin County